Below is a topical outline of articles significantly or meaningfully related the Russo-Ukrainian War; it is not an outline of articles related generally to RussianUkrainian relations. The Related outlines section contains links to other outlines related to the Russo-Ukrainian War. This outline is a topical organization of articles; for a chronological organization, please see the Timelines section below.

Overview of articles

Top level overview articles
 Russo-Ukrainian War
 War in Donbas (2014–2022)

Major overview subdivisions

 Prelude to the 2022 Russian invasion of Ukraine
 Russian invasion of Ukraine (2022–present)
 Ukrainian resistance during the 2022 Russian invasion of Ukraine

Timelines
 Timeline of the annexation of Crimea by the Russian Federation
 Timeline of the war in Donbas
 2014, 2015, 2016, 2017, 2018, 2019, 2020, 2021, 2022
 Timeline of the 2014 pro-Russian unrest in Ukraine
 Timeline of the 2022 Russian invasion of Ukraine: (Prelude) (Phase 1), (Phase 2), (Phase 3), (Phase 4)

Years in Russia
 2014, 2015, 2016, 2017, 2018, 2019, 2020, 2021, 2022, 2023

Years in Ukraine
 2014, 2015, 2016, 2017, 2018, 2019, 2020, 2021, 2022, 2023

Subjects
An alphabetical list of subjects related to the war. Articles related to a subject are listed alphabetically under the main subject.

Participants
 Combatants of the war in Donbas
 Casualties of the Russo-Ukrainian War
 Ukrainian resistance during the 2022 Russian invasion of Ukraine

Historical background

 Dissolution of the Soviet Union
 Enlargement of NATO
 NATO open door policy
 Armed Forces of Ukraine
 Russia under Vladimir Putin
 Budapest Memorandum
 2003 Tuzla Island conflict
 2007 Munich speech of Vladimir Putin
 Russia–Ukraine gas disputes
 Controversy in Russia regarding the legitimacy of eastward NATO expansion

Prelude to war
An chronological list of articles about the period immediately prelude to war; for earlier articles see the Historical background section.

 Orange Revolution
 Euromaidan
 Historical background of the 2014 pro-Russian unrest in Ukraine
 2014 pro-Russian unrest in Ukraine
 Minsk agreements
 2014 Hrushevskoho Street riots
 Revolution of Dignity
 2014 Odesa clashes
 Prelude to the 2022 Russian invasion of Ukraine
 2021–2022 Belarus–European Union border crisis

Civil Defense
 Martial law in Ukraine
 Mobilization in Ukraine

Communications and the media
 Look for Your Own
 Never Ever Can We Be Brothers
 I Want to Live (hotline)

Media

 Media portrayal of the Ukrainian crisis
 Reactions to the 2022 Russian invasion of Ukraine
 Reactions to the 2021–2022 Russo-Ukrainian crisis
 List of journalists killed during the Russo-Ukrainian War
 Disinformation in the 2022 Russian invasion of Ukraine
 Look for Your Own
 Media Center Ukraine
 Krasovsky case
 Novaya Gazeta
 Russian 2022 war censorship laws
 Ukrinform

Slogans, visual expressions, and symbols

 Putin khuylo!
 Putler
 Slava Ukraini
 Russian warship, go fuck yourself
 Soviet imagery during the Russo-Ukrainian War
 Z (military symbol)
 Strength is in truth
 Where have you been for eight years?
 Destroyed Russian military equipment exhibition
 Grain From Ukraine
 Religion and the 2022 Russian invasion of Ukraine
 White-blue-white flag

Propaganda, sham elections, and disinformation

 Disinformation in the 2022 Russian invasion of Ukraine 
 Roskomnadzor
 2014 Donbas general elections (2 November 2014)
 Declaration of Independence of the Republic of Crimea (dateneeded)
 2014 Crimean status referendum (dateneeded)
 Ukraine bioweapons conspiracy theory
 On the Historical Unity of Russians and Ukrainians
 Address concerning the events in Ukraine
 What Russia should do with Ukraine
 Manifesto of the South Russian People's Council
 Disinformation Governance Board

Crimea
 Russian occupation of Crimea

Economics and food
 Economic impact of the 2022 Russian invasion of Ukraine
 People's Bayraktar
 Signmyrocket.com
 Grain From Ukraine
 2022 Russian oil price cap

Effects within Russia
 2022 Russian martial law
 2022 Russian mobilization
 2022 Moscow rally
 2022 Moscow Victory Day Parade
 2022 "People's choice. Together Forever" concert

Elections and referendums
 2014 Donbas general elections
 2014 Donbas status referendums
 2014 Ukrainian presidential election

Energy
 Russia–Ukraine gas disputes
 Nord Stream, Nord Stream 2
 Russia in the European energy sector

Gender
 Women in the war in Donbas
 Women in the 2022 Russian invasion of Ukraine

Human rights, war crimes, genocide

Human rights
 Humanitarian situation during the war in Donbas
 Mobilization in Donetsk and Luhansk People's Republics

War crimes

 2022 Russian theft of Ukrainian grain
 Bucha massacre
 Child abductions in the 2022 Russian invasion of Ukraine
 International Criminal Court investigation in Ukraine
 Izium mass graves
 Makiivka surrender incident
 Murder of Yevgeny Nuzhin
 Russian filtration camps for Ukrainians
 Russian strikes on hospitals during the 2022 invasion of Ukraine
 Russian torture chambers in Ukraine
 Russian usage of mobile crematoriums in Ukraine
 Sexual violence in the 2022 Russian invasion of Ukraine
 Torture and castration of a Ukrainian POW in Pryvillia
 Torture of Russian soldiers in Mala Rohan
 Use of white phosphorus bombs in the 2022 Russian invasion of Ukraine
 War crimes in the 2022 Russian invasion of Ukraine

Sexual violence

 Sexual violence in the 2022 Russian invasion of Ukraine

Genocide
 Accusations of genocide in Donbas
 Allegations of genocide of Ukrainians in the 2022 Russian invasion of Ukraine
 What Russia should do with Ukraine

Population dislocation
The below includes both forced movement (e.g. ethnic cleansing) and crisis movement (e.g. war refuges/evacuees).
 Russian filtration camps of Ukrainians
 2022 evacuation of the Donetsk People's Republic and the Luhansk People's Republic
 2022 Ukrainian refugee crisis
 Mobilization in Donetsk and Luhansk People's Republics

Criminal prosecution
 Trial of Vadim Shishimarin
 Trial of Alexander Bobikin and Alexander Ivanov

Other subjects
 Russian usage of mobile crematoriums in Ukraine
 2014 Russian sabotage activities in Ukraine

Public opinion and national morale
 Be Brave Like Ukraine
 Ukrainian Freedom Orchestra
 United24
 United News (telethon)
 Destroyed Russian military equipment exhibition

Nationalism
 Pan-Slavism

Russian

 Russian nationalism
 Novorossiya
 Russian irredentism
 Russian world
 Rashism
 Putinism
 Russian imperialism
 Russian empire
 Russification

Ukrainian

 Ukrainian nationalism
 Far-right politics in Ukraine
 Ukrainian irredentism
 Ukrainization
 History of Ukrainian nationality

Occupations
Overviews
 Russian-occupied territories of Ukraine
Areas

 Russian occupation of Donetsk Oblast
 Russian occupation of Luhansk Oblast
 Russian occupation of Kharkiv Oblast
 Russian occupation of Crimea
 Russian occupation of Chernihiv Oblast
 Russian occupation of Donetsk Oblast
 Russian occupation of Kherson Oblast
 Russian occupation of Kyiv Oblast
 Russian occupation of Luhansk Oblast
 Russian occupation of Mykolaiv Oblast
 Russian occupation of Sumy Oblast
 Russian occupation of Zaporizhzhia Oblast
 Russian occupation of Zhytomyr Oblast
 Russian occupation of Snake Island

Peace issues
 Minsk II ceasefire agreement (12 February 2015)
 2022 Russia–Ukraine peace negotiations
 Crimea Platform
 I Want to Live (hotline)

Prisoners of war
 Torture of Russian soldiers in Mala Rohan
 Torture and castration of a Ukrainian POW in Pryvillia
 Murder of Yevgeny Nuzhin
 Makiivka surrender incident

Psychological
 I Want to Live (hotline)
 Never Ever Can We Be Brothers
 Ukrainian recognition of the Chechen Republic of Ichkeria

Geography
 Anti-terrorist Operation Zone

Geographic overview
 Geography of Ukraine
 Eastern Ukraine, Western Ukraine, Southern Ukraine, Northern Ukraine, Central Ukraine
 Crimea, Snake Island (Ukraine), Black Sea, Kerch Peninsula, Sea of Azov, Kerch Strait
 Administrative divisions of Ukraine, Historical regions in present-day Ukraine
 Historical regions in present-day Ukraine

Oblasts
An oblast (Cyrillic (most commonly): ,) is a type of administrative division within the Russian empire and Soviet Union that continues to be used in Russia and some post-Imperial/Soviet states.

Urban centers
 Kyiv, Kharkiv, Odesa, Mariupol, Amvrosiivka, Luhansk, Kerch, Bucha, Bakhmut, Kherson
 Azovstal iron and steel works, Kerch Strait Bridge
 Hero City of Ukraine

Territorial changes
An alphabetical outline of territorial changes during the war.

 Annexation of Crimea
 Annexation of Donetsk, Kherson, Luhansk and Zaporizhzhia
 Political status of Crimea
 Russian-occupied territories of Ukraine
 2014 Donbas status referendums
 Territorial control during the Russo-Ukrainian War

Russian occupation areas

 Russian occupation of Crimea (not yet liberated)
 Russian occupation of Donetsk Oblast (not yet liberated)
 Russian occupation of Kharkiv Oblast (not yet liberated)
 Russian occupation of Kherson Oblast (not yet liberated)
 Russian occupation of Luhansk Oblast (not yet liberated
 Russian occupation of Mykolaiv Oblast (not yet liberated)
 Russian occupation of Zaporizhzhia Oblast (not yet liberated)
 Russian occupation of Chernihiv Oblast (liberated)
 Russian occupation of Kyiv Oblast (liberated)
 2022 Snake Island campaign (liberated)
 Russian occupation of Sumy Oblast (liberated)
 Russian occupation of Zhytomyr Oblast (liberated)

Events
A chronological outline of events. Articles related to particular events are listed alphabetically under the main article for the event they are related to.
 2014 Ukrainian presidential election
 2014 Ukrainian parliamentary election (26 October 2014)
 2014 Crimean status referendum
 Minsk II ceasefire agreement (12 February 2015)
 2019 Ukrainian presidential election (31 March 2019)

Protests and unrest
 2014 anti-war protests in Russia
 2022 protests in Russian-occupied Ukraine
 Protests against the 2022 Russian invasion of Ukraine
 2022 anti-war protests in Russia
 2014 pro-Russian unrest in Ukraine
 Historical background of the 2014 pro-Russian unrest in Ukraine
 2022 Far Eastern protests
 2022 open letter from Nobel laureates in support of Ukraine

Military operations and activities
A chronological outline of military operations. Articles related to particular battles are listed alphabetically under the main article for the operation they are related to.

Chronological
When a event or topic covers more than one year the article appears in the year the event started.

2014
Overviews
 2014 Russian sabotage activities in Ukraine
 Russian occupation of Luhansk Oblast (April 2014)
 Russian occupation of Donetsk Oblast (April 2014)
Events

 2014 Russian cross-border shelling of Ukraine (date – needed)
 2014 Simferopol incident (18 March 2014)
 2014 Ukrainian Air Force Il-76 shootdown (14 June 2014)
 Battle in Shakhtarsk Raion (16 July – 26 August 2014)
 Battle of Horlivka (20 July – 6 September 2014)
 Battle of Ilovaisk (10 August – 2 September 2014)
 Battle of Kramatorsk (12 April – 5 July 2014)
 Battle of Krasnyi Lyman (date – needed)
 Battle of Mariupol (6 May – 14 June 2014)
 Battle of Novoazovsk (25–28 August 2014)
 Battles of Sievierodonetsk (2014) (date – needed)
 Siege of Sloviansk (date – needed)
 Capture of Donetsk (2014) (date – needed)
 Capture of Southern Naval Base (date – needed)
 Capture of the Crimean Parliament (date – needed)
 Fights on the Ukrainian–Russian border (2014)
 Fights on the Ukrainian–Russian border (2014) (date – needed)
 First Battle of Donetsk Airport (26–27 May 2014)
 Great Raid of 2014 (date – needed)
 Novosvitlivka refugee convoy attack (18 August 2014)
 Offensive on Mariupol (September 2014) (4–8 September 2014)
 Second Battle of Donetsk Airport (28 September 2014 – 21 January 2015)
 Shelling of Donetsk, Russia (13 July 2014)
 Siege of Sloviansk (12 April – 5 July 2014)
 Siege of the Luhansk Border Base (2–4 June 2014)
 Zelenopillya rocket attack (11 July 2014)

2015

 Battle of Debaltseve (16 January – 20 February 2015)
 Battle of Marinka (2015) (3 June 2015)
 Shyrokyne standoff (February–July 2015) (10 February – 3 July 2015)
 January 2015 Mariupol rocket attack (date – needed)

2016

 Battle of Svitlodarsk (18–23 December 2016)

2017

 Battle of Avdiivka (29 January – 4 February 2017)

2018

 Kerch Strait incident (25 November 2018)

2021

 2021 Black Sea incident (date – needed)
 Zapad 2021

2022

Overviews
 Order of battle for the 2022 Russian invasion of Ukraine
 2022 Ukrainian eastern counteroffensive (date – needed)
 2022 Ukrainian Kharkiv counteroffensive (date – needed)
 2022 Ukrainian southern counteroffensive (date – needed)
 Battle of Donbas (2022) (date – needed)
 Eastern Ukraine offensive (date – needed)
 Kyiv offensive (2022) (date – needed)
 Northeastern Ukraine campaign (date – needed)
 Southern Ukraine campaign (date – needed)

Events

 2022 bombing of Ivano-Frankivsk (date – needed)
 2022 bombing of Kryvyi Rih (date – needed)
 2022 bombing of Lviv (date – needed)
 2022 bombing of Zaporizhzhia (date – needed)
 2022 Chornobaivka attacks (date – needed)
 2022 Crimea attacks (date – needed)
 2022 Dnipro missile strikes (date – needed)
 2022 missile explosion in Poland
 2022 Novofedorivka explosions (date – needed)
 Attack on Nova Kakhovka (date – needed)
 Battle of Donbas (2022) (date – needed)
 Battle of Pisky (2022) (date – needed)
 Battle of Popasna (date – needed)
 Battle of Sviatohirsk (date – needed)
 Battle of the Svatove–Kreminna line (date – needed)
 Battle of the Siverskyi Donets (date – needed)
 Battle of Siversk (date – needed)
 Battle of Volnovakha (date – needed)
 Berdiansk port attack (date – needed)
 Chuhuiv air base attack (date – needed)
 Desna barracks airstrike (date – needed)
 First Battle of Kreminna (date – needed)
 First Battle of Lyman (date – needed)
 Second Battle of Lyman (date – needed)
 Millerovo air base attack (date – needed)
 Shelling of Donetsk, Russia (date – needed)
 Sinking of the Moskva (14 April 2022)
 Vinnytsia missile strikes (date – needed)
 Yavoriv military base attack (date – needed)

2023
 Under construction

Geographic
Articles organized by geographic region

Eastern Ukraine
Overviews
 Eastern Ukraine offensive
 2022 Ukrainian eastern counteroffensive
 Anti-terrorist Operation Zone
Events

 Battle of Avdiivka (2022–2023)
 Battle of Volnovakha
 Battle of Izium (2022)
 Battle of Rubizhne
 Battle of Marinka (2022–2023)
 Battle of Popasna
 Battle of Dovhenke
 Battle of Donbas (2022)
 First Battle of Kreminna
 Battle of the Siverskyi Donets
 Battle of Sievierodonetsk (2022)
 Battle of Toshkivka
 First Battle of Lyman
 Battle of Sviatohirsk
 Battles of Bohorodychne and Krasnopillia
 Battle of Lysychansk
 Battle of Siversk
 Battle of Pisky (2022)
 Battle of Bakhmut
 Battle of Soledar
 Battle of Pavlivka
 Battle of Balakliia
 Battle of Shevchenkove
 Battle of Kupiansk
 Second Battle of Lyman
 Second Battle of Kreminna
 Battle of Svatove

Western Ukraine
 2022 bombing of Ivano-Frankivsk
 2022 bombing of Lviv

Northeastern Ukraine
Overviews
 Northeastern Ukraine campaign
 2022 northeastern Ukraine–Russia border skirmishes
Events

 Battle of Hlukhiv
 Battle of Kharkiv (2022)
 Battle of Konotop (2022)
 Battle of Sumy
 Battle of Trostianets
 Siege of Chernihiv
 Battle of Okhtyrka
 Battle of Lebedyn
 Battle of Romny

Southern Ukraine
Overviews
 Southern Ukraine campaign
 2022 Ukrainian southern counteroffensive
Events

 Battle of Kherson
 Liberation of Kherson
 2022 bombing of Odesa
 Battle of Melitopol
 Battle of Mykolaiv
 Battle of Enerhodar
 Battles of Voznesensk
 Battle of Huliaipole
 Battle of Davydiv Brid
 Siege of Mariupol

Central Ukraine
Overviews
 Kyiv offensive (2022)
Events

 Battle of Antonov Airport
 Capture of Chernobyl
 Battle of Ivankiv
 Battle of Hostomel
 Battle of Vasylkiv
 Battle of Bucha
 Battle of Irpin
 Battle of Makariv
 Battle of Brovary
 Battle of Slavutych
 2022 bombing of Kryvyi Rih
 2022 Bombing of Zaporizhzhia

Crimea and the Black Sea
 2022 Snake Island campaign
 Sinking of the Moskva

Outside Ukraine
 2022 missile explosion in Poland
 2022 Western Russia attacks
 Shelling of Donetsk, Russia (date – needed)

Attacks on civilians
 Attacks on civilians in the 2022 Russian invasion of Ukraine

 16 March 2022 Chernihiv breadline attack
 2015 Kharkiv bombing (22 February 2015)
 2022 Dnipro missile strikes (date)
 2022 Russian strikes against Ukrainian infrastructure (date)
 2022 Zhytomyr attacks (date)
 3 March 2022 Chernihiv bombing
 April 2022 Kharkiv cluster bombing (date)
 Assassination attempts on Volodymyr Zelenskyy
 Bilohorivka school bombing (date)
 Bombing of Borodianka (date)
 Bucha massacre (date)
 Chaplyne railway station attack (date)
 Chasiv Yar missile strike (date)
 February 2015 Kramatorsk rocket attack (10 February 2015)
 February 2022 Kharkiv cluster bombing (date)
 Irpin refugee column shelling (date)
 Izium mass graves (date)
 January 2015 Mariupol rocket attack (date – needed)
 Kharkiv dormitories missile strike (date)
 Kharkiv government building airstrike (date)
 Kramatorsk railway station attack (date)
 Kremenchuk shopping mall attack (date)
 Kupiansk civilian convoy shelling (date)
 Kyiv shopping centre bombing (date)
 List of journalists killed during the Russo-Ukrainian War (date)
 Maisky Market attack (date)
 Malaysia Airlines Flight 17 (17 July 2014)
 March 2022 Donetsk attack (date)
 March 2022 Kharkiv cluster bombing (date)
 Mariupol art school bombing (date)
 Mariupol hospital airstrike (date)
 Mariupol theatre airstrike (date)
 Murder of Pentecostals in Sloviansk (date – needed)
 Mykolaiv cluster bombing (date)
 Mykolaiv government building airstrike (date)
 Novosvitlivka refugee convoy attack (date – needed)
 Olenivka prison massacre (date)
 September 2022 Donetsk attack (date)
 Serhiivka missile strike (date)
 Stara Krasnianka care house attack (date)
 Sumykhimprom ammonia leak (date)
 Vinnytsia missile strikes (date)
 Volnovakha bus attack (13 January 2015)
 War crimes in the 2022 Russian invasion of Ukraine (date)
 Zaporizhzhia civilian convoy attack (date)
 Zaporizhzhia residential building airstrike (date)

Cyberwarfare

 Russian information war against Ukraine
 Russian–Ukrainian cyberwarfare
 Ukraine power grid cyberattack (December 2015)
 2017 cyberattacks on Ukraine (June 2017)
 2022 Ukraine cyberattacks (date – needed)
 2016 Kyiv cyberattack (date – needed)
 Surkov leaks (date – needed)
 Anonymous and the 2022 Russian invasion of Ukraine

Population movement
 2022 evacuation of the Donetsk People's Republic and the Luhansk People's Republic

Illegal annexations
 Annexation referendums
 Annexation of Donetsk, Kherson, Luhansk and Zaporizhzhia oblasts

Diplomatic
 2023 visit by Volodymyr Zelenskyy to the United Kingdom
 2022 visit by Volodymyr Zelenskyy to the United States

Individuals
An alphabetical list of individuals significantly related to the war. Individuals are listed under their nationality, not political alignment.
 Women in the war in Donbas
 Women in the 2022 Russian invasion of Ukraine
 List of people and organizations sanctioned during the Russo-Ukrainian War

Russian figures

Political (pro-Russian)

 Alexander Bastrykin
 Aleksandr Dugin
 Vladimir Putin

Military (Russian aligned or controlled)

 Sergei Shoigu
 Valery Gerasimov
 Aleksandr Dvornikov
 Alexander Chaiko
 Sergey Surovikin

Other (pro-Russian)

 Igor Girkin
 Ivan Ilyin

Ukrainian figures

Political (pro-Ukrainian)

 Vitali Klitschko
 Petro Poroshenko
 Oleksii Reznikov
 Oleksandr Turchynov
 Viktor Yanukovych
 Volodymyr Zelenskyy
 Vadym Chernysh
 Oksana Koliada
 Oleksii Reznikov
 Iryna Vereshchuk

Military (Ukrainian aligned and controlled)

Journalists (pro-Ukrainian)
 Serhii Korovayny

Other (Ukrainian aligned and controlled)

 Under construction

Other individuals

Political (other)

 Alexander Lukashenko

Military (other)

 Under construction

Private (other)

 Under construction

Military units, equipment, and bases
An alphabetical list of military units involved in a significant way the war.
 Combatants of the war in Donbas
 Foreign fighters in the Russo-Ukrainian War
 List of Russo-Ukrainian conflict military equipment

Russian military units

 2022 Russian mobilization
 Chechen involvement in the 2022 Russian invasion of Ukraine
 Order of battle for the 2022 Russian invasion of Ukraine
 Combatants of the war in Donbas
Command and organization

 Ministry of Defence (Russia)
 General Staff of the Armed Forces of the Russian Federation
 Russian Ground Forces
 Russian Navy
 Russian Aerospace Forces
 Russian Airborne Forces
 Special Operations Forces (Russia)
 National Guard of Russia

Units

This section contains articles about major formations or units with significance to the war. For a complete list see List of Russian units which invaded the territory of Ukraine

 Little green men (Russo-Ukrainian War)
 Black Sea Fleet
 76th Guards Air Assault Division
 64th Separate Guards Motor Rifle Brigade
 Separate Special Purpose Battalion (Chechen)
 Russian separatist forces in Donbas
 Russian Orthodox Army
 Kalmius Brigade
 Sparta Battalion
 Somalia Battalion
 Prizrak Brigade

Ukrainian military units
Command and organization

 Headquarters of the Supreme Commander-in-Chief
 Mobilization in Ukraine
 Ukrainian Air Assault Forces
 Armed Forces of Ukraine
 Ukrainian Ground Forces
 Ukrainian Air Force
 Ukrainian Navy
 Special Operations Forces (Ukraine)
 Ukrainian Naval Infantry
 Ukrainian Naval Aviation
 Territorial Defense Forces (Ukraine)
 Ukrainian Sea Guard
 State Border Guard Service of Ukraine
 Ukrainian Air Defence Forces
 National Guard of Ukraine
 Ukrainian Airmobile Forces
 Special Tasks Patrol Police (Ukraine)

Units

 10th Mountain Assault Brigade (Ukraine)
 128th Mountain Assault Brigade (Ukraine)
 14th Separate Mechanized Brigade (Ukraine)
 17th Tank Brigade (Ukraine)
 1st Tank Brigade (Ukraine)
 24th Mechanized Brigade (Ukraine)
 25th Airborne Brigade (Ukraine)
 25th Public Security Protection Brigade
 28th Mechanized Brigade (Ukraine)
 30th Mechanized Brigade (Ukraine)
 4th Tank Brigade (Ukraine)
 53rd Mechanized Brigade (Ukraine)
 54th Mechanized Brigade (Ukraine)
 56th Motorized Brigade (Ukraine)
 57th Motorized Brigade (Ukraine)
 58th Independent Motorized Infantry Brigade (Ukraine)
 59th Motorized Brigade (Ukraine)
 72nd Mechanized Brigade (Ukraine)
 92nd Mechanized Brigade
 93rd Mechanized Brigade (Ukraine)
 95th Air Assault Brigade (Ukraine)
 Aidar Battalion
 Alpha Group (Ukraine)
 Azov Regiment
 Dnipro Battalion
 Donbas Battalion
 Dzhokhar Dudayev Battalion
 Freedom of Russia Legion
 Freedom of Russia Legion (Russian volunteers)
 Georgian Legion (Ukraine)
 Hospitallers Medical Battalion
 Kastuś Kalinoŭski Regiment (Byelorussian volunteers)
 Kharkiv Battalion
 Pahonia Regiment
 Russian Volunteer Corps
 Sheikh Mansur Battalion
 Tactical group "Belarus"
 Ukrainian territorial defence battalions

Military equipment
 List of aircraft losses during the Russo-Ukrainian War
 List of ship losses during the Russo-Ukrainian War
Russian equipment
 List of equipment used by Russian separatist forces of the war in Donbas
Ukrainian equipment
 List of equipment of the Armed Forces of Ukraine
NATO equipment
 Under construction
International equipment
 Under construction

Military bases and facilities
In Russia
 Engels-2 (air base)
In Ukraine
 Sevastopol International Airport

Military exercises
 Union Resolve 2022 (February 10-20, 2022)

Entities

Pro Russian organizations

Political (pro-Russian)

 Antifascist Committee of Ukraine
 Communist Party of the Donetsk People's Republic
 Special Coordinating Council
 Donetsk People's Republic
 Donetsk Republic (political party)
 Eurasian Youth Union
 Internet Research Agency
 Luhansk People's Republic
 New Russia Party
 Peace to Luhanshchina
 Peoples National Party
 Russian Imperial Movement
 Russian National Socialist Party
 Russian National Union
 Salvation Committee for Peace and Order
 Slavic Union
 Ukrainian Choice
 United Russia
 We Are Together with Russia

Military (Russian controlled and aligned)
 Separate Special Purpose Battalion (Chechen)

Other (pro-Russian)
 Under construction

Pro Ukrainian organizations

Political (pro-Ukrainian)

 Ministry of Reintegration of Temporarily Occupied Territories
 Militsiya (Ukraine) (until 2015)
 National Police of Ukraine (from 2015)
 Ministry of Internal Affairs (Ukraine)
 Security Service of Ukraine

Military (Ukrainian controlled and aligned)
 International Legion of Territorial Defence of Ukraine
 Headquarters of the Supreme Commander-in-Chief
 Freedom of Russia Legion
 Kastuś Kalinoŭski Regiment
 Berdiansk Partisan Army
 Popular Resistance of Ukraine
 Yellow Ribbon (movement)

Other (Ukrainian controlled and aligned)
 IT Army of Ukraine
 2022 Belarusian and Russian partisan movement

Other organizations

Political (3rd parties)

Military (3rd parties)

 Under construction

Other (3rd parties)

 Under construction

International involvement

Overviews
 United States-Ukraine relations
 EU-Ukraine relations

International events
 2014 G20 Brisbane summit (15–16 November 2014)
 2014 Wales Summit of the North Atlantic Treaty Organization (4–5 September 2014)
 40th G7 summit (4–5 June 2014)
 Eleventh emergency special session of the United Nations General Assembly (opened on 28 February 2022)
 2021 Russia–United States summit

Reactions
 Corporate responses to the 2022 Russian invasion of Ukraine
 Government and intergovernmental reactions to the 2022 Russian invasion of Ukraine
 International reactions to the war in Donbas
 Non-government reactions to the 2022 Russian invasion of Ukraine
 Reactions to the 2021–2022 Russo-Ukrainian crisis
 Reactions to the 2022 Russian invasion of Ukraine
 Unfriendly Countries List
 International recognition of the Donetsk People's Republic and the Luhansk People's Republic

Sanctions
 International sanctions during the Russo-Ukrainian War
 List of people and organizations sanctioned during the Russo-Ukrainian War
 Restrictions on transit to Kaliningrad Oblast

Investigations
 Independent International Commission of Inquiry on Ukraine
 OSCE Special Monitoring Mission to Ukraine
 Task Force on Accountability for Crimes Committed in Ukraine
 UN Human Rights Monitoring Mission in Ukraine
 International Commission of Inquiry on Ukraine
 International Criminal Court investigation in Ukraine

Other international involvement
 International recognition of the Donetsk People's Republic and the Luhansk People's Republic
 Legality of the 2022 Russian invasion of Ukraine
 Operation Atlantic Resolve, European Deterrence Initiative, NATO Enhanced Forward Presence
 2018 Moscow–Constantinople schism
 Accession of Ukraine to the European Union
 Belarusian involvement in the 2022 Russian invasion of Ukraine
 Foreign fighters in the Russo-Ukrainian War
 Ukraine v. Russian Federation (2019)
 Ukraine v. Russian Federation (2022)
 Universal jurisdiction investigations of war crimes in Ukraine
 Proposed no-fly zone in the 2022 Russian invasion of Ukraine

Military cooperation with the Russian Federation

 Zapad 2021
 Union Resolve 2022

Military cooperation with Ukraine

 European Union Military Assistance Mission in support of Ukraine
 People's Bayraktar
 2022 Ramstein Air Base meeting

Resolutions and statements
Items are listed chronologically within individual sections.

International organizations
 United Nations Security Council Resolution 2166 (21 July 2014)
 United Nations General Assembly Resolution ES-11/1 (March 2022)
 United Nations General Assembly Resolution ES-11/2 (March 2022)
 United Nations General Assembly Resolution ES-11/3 (April 2022)
 United Nations General Assembly Resolution ES-11/4 (October 2022)
 United Nations General Assembly Resolution ES-11/5 (November 2022)
 United Nations General Assembly Resolution ES-11/6 (February 2023)

Belarus
 Under construction

European Union
 Under construction

North Atlantic Treaty Organization
 Under construction

Russia
 On conducting a special military operation

Ukraine
 Ukrainian recognition of the Chechen Republic of Ichkeria

United States
 Support for the Sovereignty, Integrity, Democracy, and Economic Stability of Ukraine Act of 2014
 Ukraine Democracy Defense Lend-Lease Act of 2022
 2022 State of the Union Address

Other
 2022 open letter from Nobel laureates in support of Ukraine

Books and publications
Books
 In Isolation: Dispatches from Occupied Donbas by Stanislav Aseyev
Academic journals
 Under construction
Other
 Ami, it's time to go
Bibliographies
 Under construction

Lists
 List of Black Sea incidents involving Russia and Ukraine
 List of foreign aid to Ukraine during the Russo-Ukrainian War
 List of equipment used by Russian separatist forces of the war in Donbas
 List of aircraft losses during the Russo-Ukrainian War
 List of ship losses during the Russo-Ukrainian War
 List of Russian units which invaded the territory of Ukraine
 List of people and organizations sanctioned during the Russo-Ukrainian War
 List of journalists killed during the Russo-Ukrainian War
 List of military engagements during the 2022 Russian invasion of Ukraine

Other topics

 Krymnash
 Wagnergate
 Reactions to the 2021–2022 Russo-Ukrainian crisis
 Assassination attempts on Volodymyr Zelenskyy
 Legality of the 2022 Russian invasion of Ukraine
 Reparations from Russia after the Russo-Ukrainian War
 Ukraine and weapons of mass destruction
 2022 Irkutsk military aircraft crash
 2022 Russian mystery fires
 2022 Russian Aerospace Forces An-26 crash
 2022 Nord Stream pipeline sabotage
 2022 Russian Air Force Ilyushin Il-76 crash
 2022 Transnistria attacks
 2022 Yeysk military aircraft crash
 Crimean Bridge explosion
 2022 Irkutsk military aircraft crash
 2022 Russian mystery fires
 2022 Russian Aerospace Forces An-26 crash
 2022 Nord Stream pipeline sabotage
 2022 Russian Air Force Ilyushin Il-76 crash
 2022 Transnistria attacks
 2022 Yeysk military aircraft crash
 Restrictions on transit to Kaliningrad Oblast
 I Want to Live (hotline)
 Landmines in Ukraine

Related outlines
 Outline of Russia
 Outline of Ukraine
 Outline of the Soviet Union
 Outline of World War II
 Outline of World War I

See also

 Bibliography of Ukrainian history
 Bibliography of Russian history (1991-present)

References

Notes

Citations

Russo-Ukrainian War
+